Kaila Holtz (born September 26, 1981) is a Canadian softball pitcher.  Holtz has represented Canada at the Olympic Games.

Born in Edmonton, Alberta, Holtz began playing softball at age 10, and has attended the University of Massachusetts Amherst. She was a  part of the Canadian Softball team who finished 5th at the 2004 Summer Olympics.

References

1981 births
Living people
Canadian softball players
Canadian softball coaches
Canadian people of German descent
UMass Minutewomen softball players
UMass Minutewomen softball coaches
Olympic softball players of Canada
Softball players at the 2004 Summer Olympics
Sportspeople from Edmonton